The electoral district of Allandale was an electoral district of the Legislative Assembly in the Australian state of Victoria, located north-west of Ballarat.

The district was bounded by the city of Ballarat, Lake Burrumbeet and Burrumbeet Creek. The district was created in the electoral redistribution which came into effect in 1904, when 42 districts were abolished, including the Electoral district of Clunes and Allandale. Alexander Peacock was the last member for Clunes and Allandale.

Allandale was abolished in the electoral redistribution which came into effect in 1955, 19 new districts including Ballarat North and Ballarat South 
were created. Russell White, the last member for Allandale went on to represent Ballarat North 1955–1960.

Members

Election results

References

Former electoral districts of Victoria (Australia)
1904 establishments in Australia
1955 disestablishments in Australia